Jaworowo may refer to the following places:
Jaworowo, Gniezno County in Greater Poland Voivodeship (west-central Poland)
Jaworowo, Słupca County in Greater Poland Voivodeship (west-central Poland)
Jaworowo, Kuyavian-Pomeranian Voivodeship (north-central Poland)

See also
 Jaworów (disambiguation)